Roland Collins (born November 23, 1985), better known by the stage name Troy Ave, is an American rapper from the Crown Heights neighborhood of Brooklyn, New York City. His moniker derives from Troy Avenue, a street near his childhood home. In November 2013, his first studio album, New York City: The Album, was released. It debuted at number 47 on the US Billboard Top R&B/Hip-Hop Albums chart. He was named in XXL magazine's 2014 Freshmen Class.

Career
Collins began his rap career in 2009.

Troy Ave announced that his new street album, Dope Boy Troy Vol. 2: NuPac was released on April 14, 2017.

Controversy

Legal issues
On May 26, 2016, Collins was arrested for attempted murder and illegal weapon possession for shooting at a T.I. concert. During the event at Irving Plaza, where T.I. and others were scheduled to perform, four people were shot, one fatally, by a shooter from the VIP section of the event. The man who died, Ronald McPhatter, 33, was said to be a friend of Collins, who was first taken to NYU Langone Medical Center and then transferred to nearby NYC Health + Hospitals/Bellevue where he was arrested as a primary suspect in the shooting. While at the hospital, it was alleged that the gunshot wound was self-inflicted.

Collins pleaded not guilty, saying he was using self-defense and that he and McPhatter were shot by an unnamed assailant. He was remanded without bail. His lawyer then put out a request for the public to help with any information that witnesses can provide.

Collins dropped a single called "Chuck Norris (Hoes & Gangstas)" and a mixtape called Free Troy Ave, in reference to his current condition of being charged with shootings. It was released on June 6, 2016. On July 11, 2016, he made the final bail and was temporarily released.

Feud with Joey Badass
In June 2015, tensions began brewing between Troy Ave and a fellow Brooklyn-native rapper Joey Badass, when the latter declared himself the "#1 independent hip hop recording artist and a brand in the world" in a series of tweets, to which the former responded in another tweet by pointing out that he has been signed to Cinematic Music Group, whose music is distributed by RED Distribution, a subsidiary of Sony Music Entertainment. Joey Badass later refuted reports of a feud between him and Troy Ave in another tweet.

On July 7, 2015, in an interview with Ebro Darden on Hot 97, Joey Badass had words of praise for Troy Ave, stating: "At some point you gotta [sic] have some level of respect for Troy because, at the end of the day, we're both independent artists who are standing on major platforms next to a whole bunch of major artists and they know who we are." In February 2016, he reignited the feud in a single, titled "Ready", where he raps: "60k, first week for the badass / 200k to this day, I know you niggas mad / With that 80-20 split, my nigga do the math / my nigga Kirk just outsold Troy Ave" (in reference to Kirk Knight's debut studio album Late Knight Special and Troy Ave's second studio album Major Without a Deal). In response, Troy Ave released a diss track, titled "Badass" the following week, in which he not only insulted Joey Badass, but also targeted fellow Pro Era member Capital Steez, who committed suicide by jumping off a building in December 2012.

Following the release of "Badass", Troy Ave called in at Sway in the Morning on Shade 45, stating: "He didn't pass away; he killed himself. There's a difference. He took his own life. God gave you life, it ain't your right to take that. That's a fact. I got niggas in jail who got life sentences, they might as well be dead. They could've traded their life for his." He then received heavy criticism from fans and fellow artists alike, including Styles P, ASAP Ant and ASAP Twelvyy, who wrote, amongst a series of other tweets: "Wish I had a time machine to go back and give these niggas moms [sic] that abortion money."

On March 29, 2016, in a freestyle on Sway in the Morning, Joey Badass responded to "Badass" in a series of lines aimed at Troy Ave, though never referring to him directly. Among other lines, he rapped: "Now I won't even lie, can't agree with suicide / but in the darkest times, there's still a brighter side / He took a leap of faith and only brightened his light / You took a cheap shot at hate and only shortened your life." In an interview with HipHopDX the following day, Fat Joe stated that he personally reached out to both Joey Badass and Troy Ave to try and squash the feud, but failed.

Discography

Studio albums

Mixtapes

Singles

Promotional singles

Guest appearances

References

External links
sample tracks

1985 births
Living people
African-American male rappers
People from Crown Heights, Brooklyn
Rappers from Brooklyn
Songwriters from New York (state)
21st-century American rappers
21st-century American male musicians
21st-century African-American musicians
20th-century African-American people
African-American male songwriters